The Philippines women's national beach volleyball team is the national team of Philippines. It is governed by Philippine National Volleyball Federation (PNVF) since 2021.

Rankings 
The following pairs included are in the top 1,000 pairs in the FIVB World Rankings.

Current squad

Fixtures and results

Competitive record
The following are the rank of the Philippines women's beach volleyball team in past tournaments.

Volleyball World Beach Pro Tour

FIVB Beach Volleyball World Tour

Asian Games

Asian Beach Games

Asian Beach Volleyball Championship

AVC Beach Volleyball Continental Cup

AVC Beach Tour

South East Asian Games

South East Asian Beach Volleyball Championship

Coaches
 Dante Lopez (2009)
 Paul John Doloiras (2021–2022)
 João Luciano Kioday (2022–)

See also
 Philippines men's national beach volleyball team
 Philippines women's national volleyball team
 Philippines men's national volleyball team
 Beach Volleyball Republic
 Volleyball in the Philippines

References

Volleyball in the Philippines
V
National women's volleyball teams